The EuroSprinter family of electric locomotives is a modular concept of locomotives for the European market built by Siemens Mobility. The internal Siemens product name is ES 64, with ES for EuroSprinter and the number 64 indicating the 6,400 kW power at rail.

Additional information is given in the name on the usage (U as universal, P as prototype and F as freight) and on the number of electric power systems supported (e. g. 2 as two types, 4 as all four systems commonly used in Europe).

Development 

The first prototype ES 64 P was built in 1992, as Deutsche Bahn AG was expected to issue a large order of locomotives as a replacement for the ageing Einheits-Elektrolokomotiven. The external appearance was similar to the earlier Siemens/Krauss-Maffei made dual voltage Spanish RENFE Class 252, delivered in 1991, which in turn used three phase asynchronous drive technology introduced with the DB Class 120. The prototype was used for extensive tests in some countries in Europe (Norway, Spain, Portugal, Germany). The prototype was given the DB reporting name Class 127. It is still in service with Dispolok, a formerly Siemens-owned locomotive pool for on-hire use.

Standard types

ES 64 F 
Though it is equipped for passenger services, it is exclusively used for freight trains. It was introduced to Deutsche Bahn AG as Class 152 in 1996 and today is operated by DB Schenker Rail. Its main role is to replace the older Class 150 and Class 151 locomotives on heavy freight trains. The original German order of 195 units was reduced to 170, as the ÖBB decided that the track forces generated as a result of using nose-suspended traction motors exceeded standards and refused to certify them for use in Austria. Instead, DB AG changed the remaining 25 locomotives to Siemens model ES 64 U2 which were assigned as Class 182.

With Class 152 DB AG abandoned the CoCo wheel arrangement of the class 150 and 151; with the new digitally controlled anti wheel-slip control the tractive effort should be brought to bear more reliably: nonetheless, some engine drivers argue that in autumn, due to greater power and lighter weight, especially with slippery tracks, heavy trains are hard to accelerate.

ES 64 F4 

It is also equipped for passenger service, but seldom used in that role. ES 64 F4 is equipped for all four electric systems commonly used in Europe (15 and 25 kV AC, 1.5 and 3 kV DC). Because limited space inhibits installation of all safety systems, Class 189 is equipped with various packages giving partial European coverage, e. g. Germany and Switzerland. The braking system includes an electrical energy recovery system.

As well as being in service with Deutsche Bahn AG as Class 189, it is also utilized by SBB as Class RE 474 and in service with PKP as class EU45. Some units are available to let from the Dispolok locomotive pool.

ES 64 U 

The series ES 64 U is only capable of operating on the 15 kV 16.7 Hz AC supply. It is in service in Austria with ÖBB as Class 1016. Unlike the F series, all U series are equipped with quill drive instead, thus reducing the track forces. The ÖBB assigned the protected name Taurus to Class 1016 (and later to the Classes 1116 and 1216); since then all ES 64 U+ series are widely known as 'Taurus' locos.

It is operated by ÖBB as Class 1116, by Deutsche Bahn AG as Class 182 and as well as by MÁV as Class 470 and as a hire locomotive from Dispolok. The Hungarian-Austrian company GySEV (Győr-Sopron-Ebenfurth Railway Corp) operates these units as Class 1047.

All four European electric systems can be used by the ES 64 U4. Its electric components are mostly identical to those of ES 64 F4. The four-system series (with the 1500 V capability disabled within the software) are currently used in Austria by ÖBB and the private operator Rail Traction Service as Class 1216, in Slovenia by Slovenske železnice (SŽ) as Class 541 and in Poland by PKP Intercity (PKP IC) as Class EU44 "Husarz". In Italy RFI assigns it the classification E 190. Taurus locomotives have become notable for the musical-sounding notes, said to resemble an alto saxophone, produced when a train is moving off. The sound comes from the traction converters (German: Stromrichter).

A version of the ES 64 U4 was delivered to the Vogtlandbahn of Germany with the designation Class 183. Although the body is the same as any other ES 64 U4 locomotive, it is dual supply and can only operate on the German 15 kV 16.7 Hz AC and the Czech 25 kV 50 Hz AC systems. Even though these locomotives are only equipped to operate under AC power supplies like the DB Class 182, they received a new class designation because they meet the revised EU Driver Protection Standards which required significant structural changes: these include the entrance doors, from one on each side nearer to the middle of the locomotive to two on each side directly into the locomotive cab.

The locomotive was not modified for the record. Since then, this type has become the fastest locomotive in the world.

Derived types

Portuguese CP Class 4700 

They are mostly used on freight trains.

Belgian SNCB/NMBS Class 18 

Also called EuroSprinter ES60U3, these 120 engines, also featuring the new Siemens safety cab are rated at  instead of 6,400 due to the heavier cab, the high-speed bogies and the multi-system equipment. They are used by NMBS/SNCB on passenger trains only. 24 of them, forming Class 19, are used in fixed consists on M6 rail cars with a GF automatic coupling in order to combine two sets together.

Danish Class EG 

For the newly built crossing of the Danish straits (Great Belt Fixed Link) the Danske Statsbaner ordered 13 units of the Class EG which were delivered from 1999 to 2000. Based on the Eurosprinter concept, the wheel arrangement was modified to Co'Co' in order to ensure maximum tractive effort on the ramps. This type is closest in design to a second generation ES 64 F2, capable of operating under 15 kV and 25 kV AC.

Greek Class 120 

The OSE Class 120 is the first electric locomotives in service in Greece. From 1996 to 2001 a total of 30 class 120 were delivered. The concept is mostly identical the ES 64 P prototype, with changes to the power and the electric system (25 kV AC).

China Railways DJ1 

The Chinese Ministry of Railways purchased 20 units of type DJ1 freight locomotives, in which the design is based on second generation of EuroSprinter platform, from a joint venture formed by Siemens and Zhuzhou Electric Locomotive Works in 1997. Each 8 axle 2(Bo'Bo') locomotive consists of two coupled single cab 4 axle units.

China Railways HXD1 

Initially named DJ4, successor of the DJ1, with more powerful traction motors, higher traction effort and IGBT traction inverters. These locomotives were mainly used for running freight schedules of the Daqin Railway.

China Railways HXD1B 

Korail 8100, 8200 

Since 2000, Korea Railroad Corporation (Korail) has continuously built ES64Fs to replace older class 8000 ELs. The Korail 8000 class electric locomotives are powerful but too slow ( maximum) to operate for general passenger train. Currently, 85 ES64F variants are built (2 of Class 8100 and 83 of Class 8200).

These new 8100s and 8200s are operating on major Korail lines, including Gyeongbu, Honam, and Jungang Line.

Amtrak Cities Sprinter (ACS-64) 

The ACS-64 (Cities Sprinter) design is based on the EuroSprinter, but with substantial modifications to meet United States safety standards including crumple zones and an improved safety cage for the driver. It supports all three catenary voltages used in the northeast U.S., which is the only region with substantial intercity electrification.

Developments 

In 2010 Siemens announced a successor design, named 'Vectron' incorporating design features of both the Eurosprinter, and Eurorunner locomotives, initially available only in an electric version. The Eurosprinter design is to be continued to be offered by Siemens as well in the short term.

See also 

Contemporaries and potential competitors in the European electric locomotive market:
Bombardier TRAXX
Škoda 109E
Alstom Prima locomotives
'Lok 2000' family of locomotives produced by ABB/Adtranz for Swiss (SBB-CFF-FFS Re 460), Norwegian (NSB El 18) and Finnish Railways (VR Class Sr2)
Contemporary Siemens locomotive products
Siemens Eurorunner
Siemens Asiarunner
Amtrak ACS-64

References

Sources

External links 
Siemens Transportation Website
Drehstromloks.de - A comprehensive site about EuroSprinter and other Neubaulok series (German)
Railcolor.net - Another comprehensive site about EuroSprinter and other Neubaulok series
Specification Sheet for the ES64U2
High quality pictures of ES64F4 at Trainspo

Bo-Bo locomotives
Siemens locomotives
DSB (railway company) locomotives
15 kV AC locomotives
25 kV AC locomotives
1500 V DC locomotives
3000 V DC locomotives
Electric locomotives of Austria
Electric locomotives of Denmark
Electric locomotives of Germany
Electric locomotives of South Korea
Railway locomotives introduced in 1996
Standard gauge locomotives of Austria
Standard gauge locomotives of China
Standard gauge locomotives of Denmark
Standard gauge locomotives of Germany
Standard gauge locomotives of Greece
Standard gauge locomotives of South Korea
Standard gauge locomotives of the United States